Herbert Paul Douglas Jr. (born March 9, 1922) is an American former athlete who competed mainly in the long jump. Prior to the 2012 Summer Olympics Douglas was recognized as the oldest living African-American Olympic medalist.

Douglas graduated from Taylor Allderdice High School in Pittsburgh, Pennsylvania, in 1940 and was inducted into their alumni hall of fame in 2009. He was Allderdice's first Black basketball player. Douglas first attended Xavier University of Louisiana in 1942, and competed at the 48th Annual Penn Relays in Philadelphia, Pennsylvania, helping Xavier University win the American Quarter-Mile Relay Championship. He competed in college at the University of Pittsburgh and was inducted into the inaugural class of their sports hall of fame in 2018. Douglas is a member of Alpha Phi Omega service fraternity. He turned 100 in March 2022.

References

External links
 
 

1922 births
Living people
African-American centenarians
American centenarians
American male long jumpers
Athletes (track and field) at the 1948 Summer Olympics
Medalists at the 1948 Summer Olympics
Men centenarians
Olympic bronze medalists for the United States in track and field
Pittsburgh Panthers men's track and field athletes
Sportspeople from Pittsburgh
Taylor Allderdice High School alumni